Kazashko (Bulgarian: Казашко) is a village in north-eastern Bulgaria. It is located in the municipality of Varna, Varna Province.

As of March 2015 the village has a population of 349. It is one of the only two Lipovan villages in Bulgaria, the other being Tataritsa.

References

Villages in Varna Province